Frank Albert Weinhold (born 1941) is a Professor of Chemistry at the University of Wisconsin–Madison. He and Eric D. Glendening co-invented the Natural resonance theory.

Education and career 
Weinhold studied at University of Colorado Boulder and received BA in Chemistry in 1962. From 1962 to 1963, he was a Fulbright Scholar at University of Freiburg, Germany. He studied under Edgar Bright Wilson at Harvard University for his graduate studies in physical chemistry and obtained his PhD in 1967. He conducted postdoctoral research first at University of Oxford with Charles Coulson and then at University of California, Berkeley.

Weinhold became an assistant professor in 1969 at Stanford University. He moved to University of Wisconsin–Madison in 1976 and stayed there until now.

References

Living people
20th-century American chemists
Theoretical chemists
University of Wisconsin–Madison faculty
Stanford University Department of Chemistry faculty
University of Colorado Boulder alumni
Harvard University alumni
University of Freiburg alumni
1941 births